This is a discography of Siegfried,  the third of the four operas that comprise Der Ring des Nibelungen (The Ring of the Nibelung), by Richard Wagner, which received its premiere at the Bayreuth Festspielhaus on 16 August 1876.

Recordings

References
Notes

Sources
operaclass discography, accessed 20 November 2009

Opera discographies
Der Ring des Nibelungen
Operas by Richard Wagner